Sovetsky District is an administrative and municipal district (raion), one of the thirty-nine in Kirov Oblast, Russia. It is located in the south of the oblast. Its administrative center is the town of Sovetsk. Population:  31,840 (2002 Census);  The population of Sovetsk accounts for 60.8% of the district's total population.

People
 Vyacheslav Molotov (1890-1986)
 Leonid Govorov (1897-1955)

References

Notes

Sources

Districts of Kirov Oblast